Diane Marie Hendricks (née Smith; born 1947) is an American billionaire businesswoman and film producer from Wisconsin. She is the widow of the late businessman Ken Hendricks.

Early life
Hendricks was born in Mondovi, Wisconsin, and raised in Osseo, Wisconsin, the daughter of dairy farmers. She had her first child at the age of seventeen, and worked as a Playboy Bunny to pay her bills. She graduated from Osseo-Fairchild High School in 1965, and had been divorced from her first husband for ten years when she met Ken Hendricks.

Career
In 1975, she was selling custom-built homes and Ken was a roofing contractor. They married and became business partners. In 1982, they used their lines of credit to secure a loan that enabled them to establish ABC Supply, the nation's largest wholesale distributor of roofing, windows, gutters, and siding for residential and commercial buildings.

Hendricks owns the Hendricks Holding Company, and is the owner and chairperson of ABC Supply. In March 2012, Forbes estimated her net worth at US$2.8 billion, and $11.1 billion as of August 2021.
In 2018, Forbes ranked Hendricks the US's richest self-made woman.

Hollywood producer
She has produced movies, including The Stoning of Soraya M. (2008), about an execution in an Iranian village, An American Carol, (2008), and Snowmen, (2010).

Political donations
She donated $500,000 to Wisconsin Governor Scott Walker's 2012 campaign to avoid recall, and was his biggest donor that year. She also supported Paul Ryan. In 2014, she donated $1 million to the Freedom Partners Action Fund, a pro-Republican Super PAC created by the Koch Brothers. In both 2015 and 2016, she donated $2 million to Freedom Partners Action Fund. In 2015, she gave $5 million to a PAC associated with presidential candidate Scott Walker, of which $4 million was ultimately refunded.

In the 2016 U.S. presidential election, she gave over $5 million to the Reform America Fund, a super PAC which opposed Democratic candidate Hillary Clinton and supported Republican U.S. Senator from Wisconsin Ron Johnson. Hendricks served as an economic advisor to Donald Trump's presidential campaign.

Prior to Scott Pruitt's resignation in July 2018, she donated $50,000 to the Scott Pruitt Legal Expenses Trust.

Hendricks contributed to the campaign of Georgia representative Marjorie Taylor Greene.

Tax controversies 
Hendricks paid no state income tax in four of the five years from 2010 to 2014.

An investigation by Urban Milwaukee found that Hendricks's multi-story 8,500-square-foot home in the Town of Rock in Rock County, Wisconsin, had been assessed as a 1,663-square-foot ranch. Following the Urban Milwaukee investigation, Hendricks denied the tax assessor access to the property, citing "security reasons". After she agreed to supply the assessor with data on the home, the property's assessment was changed from  $445,700 to $1,205,500.

Personal life

Hendricks has seven children and lives in Afton, Wisconsin.

References

External links 

 Who is Diane Hendricks?  from Milwaukee Magazine
 Widow a power in Beloit, beyond from Milwaukee Journal-Sentinel
 Q&A With Diane Hendricks from Beloit Daily News
 Government, get out of the way of business – opinion piece by Diane Hendricks in USA Today
 "Diane Hendricks" IMDb

1947 births
American billionaires
American women business executives
American women company founders
American company founders
American women film producers
Businesspeople from Wisconsin
Female billionaires
Film producers from Wisconsin
Living people
People from Beloit, Wisconsin
Wisconsin Republicans
21st-century American businesswomen
21st-century American businesspeople
21st-century women philanthropists
21st-century American philanthropists